Historic Jeddah festival is an annual festival held in Al Balad district of Jeddah, western Saudi Arabia, and usually coincides with the month of Ramadan. The festival celebrates the culture and heritage of Jeddah.

Activities
The activities and events in the Historic Jeddah Festival mainly focus on daily life in old Jeddah during the past decades. The area where the festival is held includes historical buildings and mosques as well as historic open squares, like Al-Mazloom, Al-Sham, Al-Yemen, and Al-Bahr Haras.

See also

 Al-Balad, Jeddah

References

Festivals established in 2004
Festivals in Saudi Arabia
Annual events in Saudi Arabia
Tourist attractions in Jeddah
Culture in Jeddah
Ramadan